Masked Ball is a 1917 Hungarian film directed by Alfréd Deésy and featuring Béla Lugosi and Norbert Dan. The screenplay was written by Francesco Maria Piave, Eugène Scribe and Antonio Somma. It was based on the opera Un ballo in maschera by Giuseppe Verdi. 

Lugosi played Rene, a Secretary Governor, one of his earliest "red herring" roles. The film was first shown at the Urania Theater in Budapest on Oct. 21, 1917.

Cast
 Norbert Dán
 Róbert Fiáth
 Lajos Gellért (credited as Viktor Kurd)
 Annie Góth as Amalia
 Richard Kornai as Rendorfonok
 Béla Lugosi as Rene
 Gyula Feher as Osvals

See also
 Béla Lugosi filmography

References

External links

1918 films
Hungarian black-and-white films
Hungarian silent films
Films directed by Alfréd Deésy
Films based on operas
Films based on works by Eugène Scribe
Austro-Hungarian films